The Srebrenica Genocide Memorial, officially known as the Srebrenica–Potočari Memorial and Cemetery for the Victims of the 1995 Genocide, is the memorial-cemetery complex in Srebrenica set up to honour the victims of the 1995 Srebrenica massacre. The victims—at least 8,372 of them—were mainly males, mostly Muslim Bosniaks and some Catholic Croats.

, 6,938 genocide victims have been identified through DNA analysis (conducted by the International Commission on Missing Persons) of human remains recovered from mass graves and 6,643 Bosnian Muslim victims have been buried.

Background
The massacre in Srebrenica began in Potočari, where some 25,000 Bosniak Muslim refugees had desperately gathered awaiting evacuation. After entering the city on 11 July 1995, Bosnian Serb forces, led by Ratko Mladić, moved into Potočari and separated many Bosnian men and teenage boys from the rest of the crowd before killing them; some women and girls were raped and killed as well. The Dutch UN peacekeepers stationed in Srebrenica (Dutchbat) were unable to stop the massacre, despite having their headquarters in the town. In all, about 1,200 innocent people were murdered at Potočari before the survivors were evacuated to Tuzla.

In October 2000 Wolfgang Petritsch, the High Representative for Bosnia and Herzegovina, declared that the land in Potočari would be turned into a memorial and cemetery for the victims of the genocide. In May 2001, a foundation was established to oversee and finance construction of the Srebrenica Genocide Memorial. Two months later, around the time of the sixth anniversary of the massacre, a foundation stone was laid for the memorial in front of a crowd of 15,000 people. The first memorial was held in July 2002 with about 20,000 attendees. The first 600 victims were buried in the new cemetery in March 2003.

Opening
The $5.8 million memorial-cemetery complex was paid for with donations from private groups and governments. The United States provided $1 million toward the project. The memorial was opened by the former United States President, Bill Clinton, on 20 September 2003, when he told thousands of relatives of the Srebrenica massacre victims:

Clinton was the President of the United States during much of the Bosnian war and presided over the Dayton peace agreement.

Layout
The memorial centre consists of a cemetery west of road R453 linking Bratunac and Srebrenica, and an exhibition centre and offices in the ancient battery factory, which served as the headquarters of the Dutch UNPROFOR battalion during the siege of Srebrenica, east of the road.

Apart from the vast field of graves, the cemetery hosts an open-air mosque, a list of names of the victims engraved in a semi-circular stone installation, and a small exhibition hall for temporary exhibitions.

On the area of the ancient battery factory and Dutchbat headquarters, partly ruined industrial buildings host exhibitions commemorating the siege of Srebrenica, the Srebrenica genocide, and the consequences for the lives of survivors. The lives of some of the victims are illustrated, and the development of the genocide is explained in text, videos, and maps. Another exhibition in the former offices of the Dutch forces deals with the role of the international community in the siege and genocide. A UN lookout made of sandbags is also on display. Information boards explain the situation on the military base during the siege.

Anniversaries
On 5 July 2005, Bosnian Serb police found two bombs at the memorial site, just days ahead of a ceremony to mark the massacre's 10th anniversary, when 580 identified victims were to be buried during the ceremony, and more than 50,000 people, including international politicians and diplomats, were expected to attend. The bombs would have caused widespread loss of life and injury had they exploded, and were probably aimed at plunging the region into further bloodshed.

On 11 July 2007, 30,000 gathered to the 12th anniversary. Carla del Ponte, the chief prosecutor of International Criminal Tribunal for the former Yugoslavia, also attended. On 12 July 2007, a day after the 12th anniversary of the massacre and the burial of a further 465 victims, a group of men dressed in Chetnik uniforms marched the streets of Srebrenica. They all wore badges of military units which committed the massacre in July 1995.

On 11 July 2009, marking the 14th anniversary, some 40,000 Bosniak mourners, a number of western diplomats, and civic associations from across the region attended the burial ceremony on Saturday for 534 newly identified victims. Among the victims were 44 teenagers. No Bosnian Serb high-level officials were present at the ceremony. Ethnically related incidents such as graffiti containing threats on a mosque and the vandalism of Bosnia and Herzegovina's national flag torn from the Bratunac town-hall building occurred. Members of the Ravna Gora Chetnik movement desecrated the flag of Bosnia and Herzegovina, marched in the streets wearing T-shirts with the face of Ratko Mladić and sang Chetnik songs. A group of men and women associated with Obraz "chanted insults directed towards the victims and in support of the Chetnik movement, calling for eradication of Islam". A full report of the incident was submitted to the local District Prosecutor's Office but no one has been prosecuted. Bosnia and Herzegovina does not have a law banning fascist organizations and similar groups and the police there considered it "freedom of association".

On 11 July 2010, the 15th anniversary of the massacre, 775 coffins of Bosnian Muslims and Croats were buried, including one Roman Catholic Bosnian Croat. Serbian President Boris Tadić attended the ceremony. 

On 17 November 2012, various war veteran groups from Bosnia and Herzegovina, Serbia, and Croatia visited the memorial and paid tribute.

Collective burials have also been annually held since 2012, the same as before; the twenty-second one is the last to date, on 11 July 2017 when remains of 71 newly identified victims were buried at the Memorial Center.

Gallery

See also

 Bosnian War
 Bosnian genocide
 Bosnian genocide denial
 Srebrenica massacre
 Srebrenica
 Potočari
 Mullivaikal Muttram

References

External links

  
 Srebrenica360.com 
 Partial list of child victims of the Srebrenica massacre

2003 establishments in Bosnia and Herzegovina
Monuments and memorials in Bosnia and Herzegovina
Cemeteries in Bosnia and Herzegovina
Bosnian War
History of Republika Srpska
Srebrenica massacre
Memorials by commemoration